The 25th World Mountain Running Championships were held in Madesimo and Campodolcino, Italy on September 6, 2009. Around 315 athletes from 37 countries competed in this year's event.

Medals

Results

Men

Women

References
 WMRA website

2009
World Mountain Running Championships
World Mountain Running Championships
Sport in Lombardy